Lotan or Litanu (Ugaritic: Ltn) was a Levantine sea monster who fought the god Baʿal and developed in Hebrew lore as Leviathan.

Lotan may also refer to:

 Lotan, Israel, a Kibbutz in southern Israel
 Lotan Baba or Mohan Das, Indian holy man promoting peace by rolling his body along the ground when he travels
 Lotan son of Seir, a person named in the Bible
 Loton, a village in Naraingarh, Haryana, India

Surname
Jonah Lotan (born 1973), Israeli actor
Nili Lotan, Israeli-American fashion designer

See also

Lota (name)
Lotar (disambiguation)

Hebrew-language surnames